The Dancer's Peril is a 1917 American silent romance film directed by Travers Vale and starring Alice Brady, Philip Hahn and Harry Benham. Its plotline features the Ballets Russes, then appearing in a show by the Shubert Brothers, major backers of World Film. The film still survives, unlike many others from the era.

Cast
 Alice Brady as Mother / Daughter 
 Philip Hahn as Grand Duke Alexis 
 Harry Benham as Richard Moraino 
 Montagu Love as Michael Pavloff 
 Alexis Kosloff as Nicholas 
 Augusta Burmeister as Marta Antonovitch 
 Louis R. Grisel as Marta's Husband 
 Jack Drumier as Lamoraux 
 Johnny Hines as Ivan 
 Sidney D'Albrook as Boris

References

Bibliography
  Richard Koszarski. An Evening's Entertainment: The Age of the Silent Feature Picture, 1915-1928. University of California Press, 1994.

External links
 

1917 films
1917 drama films
American silent feature films
Films directed by Travers Vale
American black-and-white films
World Film Company films
Films shot in Fort Lee, New Jersey
1910s English-language films
1910s American films
Silent American drama films